This is a list of dishes in Hawaiian cuisine, which includes Native Hawaiian cuisine and the broader fusion Cuisine of Hawaii. The Cuisine of Hawaii refers to the indigenous, ethnic, and local cuisines within the diverse state of Hawaii.

Meals

Breakfast 
 Portuguese sausage, eggs and rice is one of the most common breakfasts of Hawaii. It includes linguiça, eggs, and white rice. The McDonald's franchise in Hawaii has adapted this dish and put it on their breakfast menu as a replacement to bacon, ham, and eggs.
 Hawaiian French toast (see entry for Portuguese sweet bread)

Entrees and combos

 Plate lunch
 Mixed plate (plate lunch with two types of protein)
 Loco moco
 Poke
 Ahi poke
 Spam musubi, musubi made with Spam

Desserts 

 Butter mochi
 Chantilly cake
 Chiffon cake
 Chichi dango
 Dobash cake
 Guri-guri
 Halo halo
 Haupia
 Haupia cake
 Hawaiian shave ice
 Ko'elepalau—sweet potato pudding
 Kulolo
 Mochi
 Pineapple upside-down cake
Pumpkin Mochi
 Purple sweet potato haupia pie
 Yōkan

Breads and pastries 

 Andagi
 Anpan
 Coconut (haupia) pie
 Long John
 Portuguese sweet bread
 Malasada
 Mango bread
 Manapua filled with adzuki bean paste
 Manju

Cheese 
 Puna goat cheese

Fruit and vegetables 

 Avocado
 Banana
 Breadfruit
 Starfruit
 Coconut
 Curuba
 Daikon
 Fig
 Fiddlehead fern salad
 Gobō
 Grape
 Green papaya salad
 Guava
 Haden (mango)
 Kimchi
 Lemon
 Lime
 Lychee
 Mango
 Mountain apple
 Nishime—traditional Japanese vegetable stew sometimes prepared with either pork or chicken
 Onion
 Orange
 Papaya
 Passion fruit
 Kaki
 Poha
 Pineapple (tinned)
 Pomelo
 Soursop
 Strawberry
 Surinam Cherry
 Maui onion
 Okinawan sweet potato
 Takuwan
 Tamarind
 Taro
 Tsukemono
 Watermelon
 Winged bean

Vegetable proteins
 Adzuki bean
 Tofu
 Agedashi tofu
 Miso

Herbs and seasonings
 Hawaiian chili pepper
 Hawaiian salt
 Inamona
 Kiawe
 Shoyu
 Panko
 Rice vinegar

Meats

Beef 

 Beef chili with hot dogs
 Beef stew
 Bulgogi
 Corned beef hash
 Hawaiian beef curry stew
 Galbi
 Loco Moco
 Meatloaf
 Pipikaula ("beef rope"), a salted and dried beef that resembles beef jerky
 Stuffed cabbage
 Sukiyaki
 Teriyaki beef
 Teriyaki burgers

Chicken 
 Adobo
 Chicken katsu
 Chicken long rice
 Chicken luau 
 Chicken teriyaki
 Fried chicken
 Hawaiian sesame chicken
 Huli-huli chicken
 Shoyu chicken
 Mochiko chicken

Fish 

 Abalone
 Yellowfin tuna (Ahi)
 Skipjack tuna (Aku)
 Bacalhau
 Butterfish (black cod)
 Kamaboko
 Ika (squid)
 Lomi-lomi salmon
 Mahimahi
 Onaga
 Ono (Wahoo)
 Opah (Moonfish)
 Crimson jobfish (opakapaka)
 Opihi
 Poke
 Sakura-boshi—yellow-fin tuna jerky
 Sashimi
 Shrimp tempura
 Squid lu'au
 Tako
 Goatfish (weke)
 Hawaiian grouper (Hapu'upu'u)
 Kajiki (A'u)
 Limpet (Cellana exarata, C. sandwichenis) ('opihi)
 Nairagi—striped marlin
 Nohu—devil scorpion fish
 Parrotfish (uhu)
 Saltwater eel
 Wrasse or Sandfish (Lepidaplois bilunulatus or L. modestus)

Pork 

 Adobo
 Char siu
 Kalua pork
 Laulau
 Linguiça (Portuguese sausage)
 Lumpia
 Manapua
 Maui hot dogs
 Shoyu hot dogs—simmered in ginger, soy sauce, and brown sugar
 Shoyu pork (rafute)
 Spam musubi
 Suckling pig
 Sweet and sour spare rib
 Tonkatsu
 Won ton

Noodles 
 Chow fun
 Chow mein
 Fried saimin

Rice 
 Bibimbap
 Steamed rice
 Fried rice
 Mochi rice
 Musubi
 Futomaki
 Inarizushi

Snacks and candies 

 Arare
 Chocolate-covered macadamia nuts
 Coconut balls
 Crack seed
 Macadamia nuts
 Maui-style potato chips
 Shortbread
 Shoyu peanuts
 Shrimp chips
 Won ton chips (actually One-Ton chips)

Soups 

 Oxtail soup
 Saimin
 Portuguese bean soup (sopa de feijao)
 Ashitibichi—Okinawan pig's feet soup
 Wonton mein

Specialty products
 Kava (awa)
 Kona coffee
 Kukui
 Tī

Starch dishes

 Macaroni salad
 Poi
 Potato mac salad
 Polynesian arrowroot

See also
 Cuisine of Hawaii
 Oceanic cuisine

Notes

References 
 

Hawaiian cuisine
Hawaii
dishes